Shaul Gutman (born 9 September 1945) is an Israeli academic and former politician.

Biography
Born in Be'erot Yitzhak during the Mandate era, Gutman grew up in Rehovot and studied at the Technion and Berkeley, before returning to the Technion as a professor.

In 1992 he was elected to the Knesset on the Moledet list. However, he left the party on 24 July 1995 to establish Yamin Yisrael. He lost his seat when the party failed to cross the electoral threshold in the 1996 elections.

References

External links
 

1945 births
Kibbutzniks
Jews in Mandatory Palestine
Israeli academics
Technion – Israel Institute of Technology alumni
University of California, Berkeley alumni
Academic staff of Technion – Israel Institute of Technology
Leaders of political parties in Israel
Living people
Moledet politicians
Yamin Yisrael politicians
Members of the 13th Knesset (1992–1996)
People from Rehovot